Illinois Chamber of Commerce, or The Illinois State Chamber of Commerce, is a state lobbying group representing the interests of many businesses across the state of Illinois. It is not a government agency, but a non-profit membership business advocacy organization.

The Chamber is staffed with policy experts, lobbyists and business advocates. Politically, the Chamber is generally considered to be a conservative organization, but is non-partisan and works across party lines to work in the interest of the entire Illinois business community. The Chamber is one of the largest broad-based business lobbying groups in Illinois.

History

On May 27, 1919, 24 business leaders assembled in Quincy, Illinois from various locations throughout the state to deal with the issue of "too much government in business" and to "promote and protect the business climate in Illinois". On August 2, 1919, the Illinois Chamber was officially charters by the Secretary of State's office, with its charter membership seeking to promote and develop Illinois, foster its abundance of natural resources, and improve its conditions so the greatest possible benefit and enjoyment could be derived by living in Illinois. At first, the Illinois Chamber and its membership pledged to "refrain from any political involvement", however it was apparent that to move Illinois' business climate forward, it would need to provide legislative information on a regular basis to its members and in 1923, an office in Springfield was opened for that very purpose. In the early years, the Illinois Chamber was a driving force behind the formation of the Illinois State Police and establishing an appointed State Board of Education.

Today, the Illinois Chamber of Commerce still has a mission to "aggressively advocate the interests of business and promote prosperity and opportunity for the citizens of Illinois” and "be the unifying voice for business in Illinois and advance the Chamber’s position as a credible, highly regarded and effective public policy advocate.” The Illinois Chamber serves businesses large and small and works with state government leaders to educate and influence lawmakers on ways to enhance the states economy through enacting pro-business legislation.

The Illinois Chamber has hosted many political leaders in the past, including President George W. Bush in 2008 when he addressed Illinois Chamber members and the world about the state of the economy.

The Illinois Chamber serves all business and employers in these towns, villages, cities and counties.

Functions

Membership

Membership is the driving force behind the Illinois Chamber's operation, working with employers across the state to develop a pro-business agenda.

Political Action Committee

Created in 1975, Chamber PAC is one of the oldest business political action committees in Illinois.

Foundation
The main purpose of the Illinois Chamber of Commerce Foundation is to raise and expend funds for the purposes of financing and sponsoring, publishing, promoting and distributing research on issues important to businesses or issues and analyses of the Illinois economy and business climate; providing educational forums that facilitate the discussion and debate of policy or operational matters that impact businesses generally, business segments of the Illinois economy, or the Illinois business climate; and with other organizations, sponsor activities and research projects that are consistent with the stated purposes above.

Legislative Activity 
Workers' Compensation
The Illinois Chamber took the lead in the last 8 years to enact legislation to reform the workers' compensation system on behalf of employers across Illinois.

References 

Chambers of commerce in the United States
Organizations established in 1919
1919 establishments in Illinois